Ustra Peak is a rocky peak of 195 m on the coast of Walker Bay, Livingston Island in the South Shetland Islands, Antarctica.  The peak was named after the medieval Bulgarian fortress of Ustra in the Eastern Rhodope Mountains.

Location
It was mapped by the British in 1968, and by the Bulgarians in 2005 and 2009.

Maps
 L.L. Ivanov et al. Antarctica: Livingston Island and Greenwich Island, South Shetland Islands. Scale 1:100000 topographic map. Sofia: Antarctic Place-names Commission of Bulgaria, 2005.
 L.L. Ivanov. Antarctica: Livingston Island and Greenwich, Robert, Snow and Smith Islands. Scale 1:120000 topographic map.  Troyan: Manfred Wörner Foundation, 2009.

References
 Ustra Peak. SCAR Composite Antarctic Gazetteer
 Bulgarian Antarctic Gazetteer. Antarctic Place-names Commission. (details in Bulgarian, basic data in English)

External links
 Ustra Peak. Copernix satellite image

Mountains of Livingston Island